The 2017 Thüringen Rundfahrt der Frauen (also known as the Internationalen LOTTO Thüringen Ladies Tour for sponsorship reasons) was the 30th edition of the Thüringen Rundfahrt der Frauen, a women's cycling stage race in Germany. It was rated by the UCI as a category 2.1 race and was held between 12 and 18 July 2017.

The race was won by home rider Lisa Brennauer, who regained the race lead from 's Hayley Simmonds after the fourth stage individual time trial. Brennauer finished 19 seconds clear of Ellen van Dijk, who was racing for a Netherlands national team, while Simmonds completed the podium, a further 16 seconds in arrears.

Teams
A total of 18 teams took part in the race.

Schedule
The race route was announced on 9 May 2017.

Stages

Prologue
12 July 2017 — Gera to Gera, individual time trial (ITT)

Stage 1
13 July 2017 — Schleiz to Schleiz,

Stage 2
14 July 2017 — Dörtendorf to Dörtendorf,

Stage 3
15 July 2017 — Weimar to Weimar,

Stage 4
16 July 2017 — Schmölln to Schmölln, individual time trial (ITT)

Stage 5
17 July 2017 — Greiz to Greiz,

Stage 6
18 July 2017 — Gotha to Gotha,

Classification leadership table
In the 2017 Thüringen Rundfahrt der Frauen, six different jerseys were awarded. The most important was the general classification, which was calculated by adding each cyclist's finishing times on each stage. Time bonuses were awarded to the first three finishers on all mass-start stages: the stage winner won a ten-second bonus, with six and four seconds for the second and third riders respectively. Bonus seconds were also awarded to the first three riders at intermediate sprints; three seconds for the winner of the sprint, two seconds for the rider in second and one second for the rider in third. The rider with the least accumulated time is the race leader, identified by a yellow jersey. This classification was considered the most important of the 2017 Thüringen Rundfahrt der Frauen, and the winner of the classification was considered the winner of the race.

There was also a mountains classification, the leadership of which was marked by a black, white and yellow jersey. In the mountains classification, points towards the classification were won by reaching the top of a climb before other cyclists. Each climb was categorised as either first, second, or third-category, with more points available for the higher-categorised climbs. First-category climbs awarded the most points; the first four riders were able to accrue points, compared with the first three on all other climbs.

Additionally, there was a sprints classification, which awarded a blue jersey. In the sprints classification, cyclists received points for finishing in the top 5 in a stage, except the time trials. For winning a stage, a rider earned 5 points, with 4 for second, 3 for third, 2 for fourth and a single point for 5th place. Points were also awarded at intermediate sprints on each mass-start stage – awarded on a 3–2–1 scale. The fourth jersey represented the young rider classification, marked by a red and white jersey. This was decided the same way as the general classification, but only riders born on or after 1 January 1995 were eligible to be ranked in the classification.

The fifth jersey represented the classification for German riders, marked by a white and blue jersey. This was decided on each day's stage results, but only riders born in Germany were eligible to be ranked in the classification. The sixth and final jersey (coloured white and green) was for the most active rider, decided daily by a race jury. A purple jersey, presented on the podium only, was also given to amateur riders. There was also a team classification, in which the times of the best three cyclists per team on each stage were added together; the leading team at the end of the race was the team with the lowest total time.

See also

 Thüringen Rundfahrt der Frauen
 2017 in women's road cycling

Notes

References

External links

2017 in women's road cycling
2017
2017 in German sport